Konstantinos Louboutis (born 10 June 1979) is a Greek former professional footballer. He was a defender who played as a left back.

Louboutis' career began when he signed a professional contract with hometown club Aris Thessaloniki, making his first first-team appearance in 1995, at the age of 16. After seven years with the team he joined Serie A side Perugia before the start of the 2002–03 season. He was not able to become a regular in the team and played for a while for Siena on loan. When he returned to Perugia, the club was relegated to the Serie B, but he still was not a regular in the first team. He moved to the Netherlands to play for Eredivisie side FC Twente, where he only played 10 matches, then moved to ADO Den Haag before the start of 2006–07. During a training session on 24 August 2006, he suffered a knee injury that kept him out for five to six months. In July 2007, he transferred to Anorthosis Famagusta.

In January 2008, he moved to Levadiakos, until July 2008, when he moved to PAS Giannina. He was released in 2010.

Honours
Perugia
UEFA Intertoto Cup: 2003

Anorthosis Famagusta
Cypriot Championship:2008
Cypriot Cup: 2007

References

adodenhaag.nl
clubachterdeduinen.nl
vi.nl

External links

Profile at pasgiannina.gr

1979 births
Living people
Greek footballers
Greece international footballers
Greece under-21 international footballers
Association football defenders
A.C.N. Siena 1904 players
ADO Den Haag players
Anorthosis Famagusta F.C. players
Aris Thessaloniki F.C. players
Levadiakos F.C. players
PAS Giannina F.C. players
FC Twente players
A.C. Perugia Calcio players
Footballers from Thessaloniki
Greek expatriate footballers
Greek expatriate sportspeople in Italy
Expatriate footballers in Italy
Expatriate footballers in Cyprus
Expatriate footballers in the Netherlands
Serie A players
Serie B players
Super League Greece players
Football League (Greece) players
Eredivisie players
Cypriot First Division players